Love Hurts is a British comedy-drama series that was broadcast from 3 January 1992 to 18 March 1994 on BBC One. It was scripted by Laurence Marks and Maurice Gran and starred Adam Faith as Frank Carver, Zoë Wanamaker as Tessa Piggott, Tony Selby as Max Taplow and Jane Lapotaire as Diane Warburg. Zoë Wanamaker received a 1993 Best Actress BAFTA nomination for her work in the series.

The theme tune was written by Alan Hawkshaw and performed by Peter Polycarpou.

Plot
When her married long-term boyfriend (who was also her boss) decides to end their relationship for a younger woman, Tessa Piggott (Zoë Wanamaker) leaves her high powered City career and, determined to change her life and leave the rat race, with the help of an old University friend (Jane Lapotaire) - who is also a rabbi, takes a job supervising a charitable Third World development agency. She also resolves to give up relationships, until that is, she meets wealthy and roguish 'hands on' entrepreneur Frank Carver (Adam Faith), who has built up his successful plumbing business from scratch, and romance beckons.  Their 'on/off' romance follows throughout the three series, often complicated by their numerous friends, family and work colleagues.

References

External links
 

1992 British television series debuts
1994 British television series endings
1990s British comedy-drama television series
BBC television dramas
English-language television shows
Television series by Fremantle (company)
BBC television comedy